Sontaya Wongprates (born 30 November 1975) is a Thai boxer. He competed in the men's bantamweight event at the 2000 Summer Olympics.

References

1975 births
Living people
Sontaya Wongprates
Sontaya Wongprates
Boxers at the 2000 Summer Olympics
Place of birth missing (living people)
Asian Games medalists in boxing
Boxers at the 1998 Asian Games
Sontaya Wongprates
Medalists at the 1998 Asian Games
Bantamweight boxers
Sontaya Wongprates